Shakhida Shaimardanova (born 1938) is an Uzbek composer who is best known for her Symphony in C Major.
Shaimardanova was born in Tashkent, where she studied music at the Tashkent Conservatory from 1957 to 1964. She uses themes from Uyghur folk music in her compositions. Her Symphony in C Major was recorded by the Uzbek State Philharmonic directed by Zakhid Khaknazarov on Molodiva D 076785/86. 

Shaimardanova’s compositions include:

Orchestra 
Sinfonietta

Symphony in C Major

Violin Concerto

Vocal 
Songs

References 

Soviet women composers
Uzbekistani composers
Composers for violin
1938 births
Musicians from Tashkent
Living people